The Lone Avenger is a 1933 American Western film directed by Alan James and written by Forrest Sheldon and Betty Burbridge. The film stars Ken Maynard, Muriel Gordon, James Marcus, Alan Bridge, Niles Welch and William Bailey. The film was released on May 14, 1933, by Sono Art-World Wide Pictures.

Plot

Cast          
Ken Maynard as Cal Weston
Muriel Gordon as Ruth Winters
James Marcus as Jud Winters 
Alan Bridge as Burl Adams
Niles Welch as Martin Carter
William Bailey as Sam Landers 
Charles King as Nip Hawkes
Ed Brady as Tuck Hawkes 
Jack Rockwell as Sheriff
Clarence Geldart as Dr. Crandall

References

External links
 

1933 films
American Western (genre) films
1933 Western (genre) films
Films directed by Alan James
American black-and-white films
1930s English-language films
1930s American films